Dixie High School is a public school for grades 8–12 in Due West, South Carolina, United States. It is part of the Abbeville County School District. As of 2015 it had an enrollment of 415 students.

Athletics
Dixie High School participates in 12 varsity sports. In addition, football, volleyball, boys and girls basketball, baseball, boys and girls soccer, and softball teams participate in the junior varsity programs. Dixie High School's athletic teams are known as the Hornets.

State championships 
 Basketball - Boys: 1957, 1972
 Cross Country - Boys: 2016, 2020
 Cross Country - Girls: 2021
 Soccer - Boys: 2019
 Softball: 2014, 2016, 2019
 Volleyball: 1981, 1987, 1988

Notable alumni
 Casey Ashley, professional bass fisherman and winner of the 2015 Bassmaster Classic.
 Jim Lauderdale, Grammy nominated American country, bluegrass, and Americana singer-songwriter.

See also
 List of high schools in South Carolina

References

External links
 School website

Public high schools in South Carolina
Schools in Abbeville County, South Carolina
Public middle schools in South Carolina